Vui Manu'a was a Western Samoan chief and politician. He served as a member of the Legislative Assembly from 1948 to 1954.

Biography
Following the creation of the Legislative Assembly in 1948, he  was chosen to represent Fa'asaleleaga by the three Fautua (high chiefs). He was re-elected in 1951, serving until the 1954 elections.

References

Samoan chiefs
Members of the Legislative Assembly of Samoa